Geffrey Davis (born 1983) is an American poet and professor. He is the author of Revising the Storm (2014) and Night Angler (2019). He teaches in The Arkansas Programs in Creative Writing and Translation at the University of Arkansas and lives in Fayetteville, Arkansas. He also serves on the poetry faculty at the Rainier Writing Workshop, a low-residency MFA program at Pacific Lutheran University.

Personal life and education 
Davis was born in Seattle, Washington in 1983 and grew up in Tacoma, Washington. He has two younger brothers and a younger sister. At the time of Davis' birth, his father was in the Navy, although a serious ankle injury led to his medical discharge. He became a blue-collar worker after that: roofing, welding, building custom campers, etc. Davis' father developed a drug addiction when Davis was a toddler, causing the family to move around frequently while he was growing up. The family lived in 10 different cities and about 14 different houses, including a trailer park and a little time spent in a family shelter. One memorable place they lived (when Davis was about 7 or 8 years old) was a large farm in a small, rural town called Onalaska, WA. The farm had all kinds of livestock and wide fields of hay. Davis left that farm with a deeper love of the outdoors and especially of fishing. When he was partway through the 4th grade, the family moved to Tacoma, WA, where they more-or-less put down roots. Many of these places appear throughout Davis' poetry, especially his first book Revising the Storm (2014). His mother worked primarily in education and childcare, often relying on side jobs to make ends meet, until the housing crisis in 2008 forced her to work full-time for a major department store retailer.

Davis attended Stadium High School, a public school in Tacoma. Davis graduated from Stadium High School in 2001 and started writing poetry seriously that summer, after a best friend who was a writer invited him to try writing a poem.

Davis earned his B.A. from Oregon State University in 2006, made possible through a combination of scholarships and federal aid. Throughout college, he also worked several different jobs—washing dishes, plumbing, painting houses, tutoring—to help pay his way. These experiences are later referenced in his poetry. As an undergraduate student, Davis first double majored in zoology and photography, intending to become a wildlife journalist and study wolves. However, he started struggling with many of the required courses for the science degree and nearly failed out of college. He was encouraged by mentors to switch his major to English, given his tendency to take literature courses as electives. He fell in love instantly with his new major and his grades and academic experience improved immediately. As an English major at Oregon State, he took creative writing courses from the poets Joseph Millar and David Biespiel and from the fiction writer Marjorie Sandor.

After taking a year off after graduation, Davis worked at a grocery store until he moved to State College, Pennsylvania, where Davis received three graduate degrees—an M.A. in English (2009), an M.F.A. in Poetry (2012), and a Ph.D. in English (2014)—from The Pennsylvania State University.

As a graduate student, Davis was enrolled in the MA/PhD track, which focused on studying and writing critically about literature. However, he kept sneaking into the occasional creative writing workshop. After completing the Master of Arts (MFA) degree in English in 2009, the poet Robin Becker, who was a professor of creative writing at Penn State at the time, invited Davis to join the creative writing program in poetry. He became dually enrolled in both the PhD program and the MFA program. He completed the MFA degree in 2012, under the mentorship of poets Robin Becker and Julia Spicher Kasdorf. His first book, Revising the Storm, began as his MFA thesis and was revised heavily over the next two years.

As a graduate student at Penn State, Davis met his now-wife, scholar and writer Lissette Lopez Szwydky, and they have a son. While a graduate student at Penn State, Davis joined Cave Canem, which he regularly praises as having heavily influenced his development as a writer and a teacher. He was a fellow of Cave Canem in 2012 and 2013.

Awards and honors 
Revising the Storm won the 2013 A. Poulin, Jr. Poetry Prize, selected by Dorianne Laux, and was named a finalist for the 2015 Hurston-Wright Legacy Award. Davis has received the Anne Halley Poetry Prize, the Dogwood Prize in Poetry, the Leonard Steinberg Memorial/Academy of American Poets Prize, the Wabash Prize for Poetry, and fellowships from the Cave Canem Foundation.  His poems have been published in numerous literary journals and magazines, including Crazyhorse, Hayden’s Ferry Review, The Massachusetts Review, Mid-American Review, Mississippi Review, The New York Times Magazine, Nimrod International Journal, and Sycamore Review. In 2011, Davis co-founded the journal Toe Good Poetry with Jerry Brunoe and Kevin Hockett. In 2018, he received a fellowship from the prestigious Bread Loaf Writers' Conference.

His second book of poetry, Night Angler (BOA Editions, 2019) won the 2018 James Laughlin Award, a second-book prize from the Academy of American Poets.

Bibliography 
 
Night Angler. BOA Editions. 2019. .

Adaptations 
 "From 35,000 Feet / Praise Aviophobia" was adapted into a short film by Motion Poems, directed by Chad Howitt.

External links 
 Geffrey Davis's Faculty Page at The University of Arkansas
 Poet Profile: Academy of American Poets > Poets > Geffrey Davis

References 

American male poets
African-American poets
Poets from Washington (state)
Writers from Seattle
Living people
1983 births
University of Arkansas faculty
People from Fayetteville, Arkansas
21st-century American poets
21st-century American male writers
21st-century African-American writers
African-American male writers
Pacific Lutheran University faculty